Khirsu is a hill station in a Pauri Garhwal district of the state of Uttarakhand, India. Khirsu is a situated at an altitude of 1760 m. with 19 KM towards north from Pauri and 160 KM from Dehradun city towards west.

Khirsu is famous for its scenic background. From this hill station one can see spectacular 300 km-wide panoramic view of the Himalayas, including snow-crested Trishul, Nanda Devi, Nandakot, Chaukhamba and Panchchuli peaks.

References

Pauri Garhwal district